Java moss is a common name for several plants and may refer to:

Taxiphyllum barbieri
Vesicularia dubyana

Hypnaceae